A zephyr is a garment worn in competitive rowing.

A zephyr is usually a short-sleeved T-shirt with a front opening, with the opening and sleeve ends trimmed in the colours of the club.

See also

Sportswear (activewear)

References

Sportswear
Tops (clothing)